Sion submitted its bid for the 2006 Winter Olympics backed up by the Swiss Olympic Association. The sports concept was considered as "well thought out with the Olympic Village centrally located in Sion, the ice sports in the Rhône valley and the skiing events in the mountains on either side of the city".

Venues
The proposed venues were:

Sion Cluster
 Sion - ceremonies, main olympic village, figure skating, short track 
 Martigny - ice hockey, speed skating (temporary)
 Visp - ice hockey
 Crans-Montana- alpine skiing, snowboard, ski jumping, curling, Nordic combined
 Veysonnaz - alpine skiing, freestyle skiing
 Goms Valley - biathlon, cross-country skiing, Nordic combined

St. Moritz Venue
 St. Moritz - St. Moritz-Celerina Olympic Bobrun for bobsleigh, luge, and skeleton

References
Notes

External links
 Candidate city bidbook

2006 Winter Olympics bids
Sion, Switzerland